NCAA Division I independent schools are teams that compete in NCAA ice hockey but are not members of a conference. There are several current schools who, at one time or another, competed as Division I independents.

Current independent programs

Men

Alaska played infrequently as an independent program prior to 1985. They returned to independent status after the Great West Hockey Conference dissolved in 1988 and then joined the CCHA in 1995. The team was one of two final members of the men's division of the WCHA in 2021 and formally dissolved the men's side of the conference in 2021 (the WCHA remains in operation as a women-only league).

Alaska-Anchorage first moved to D1 status in hockey in 1984, and played its first couple years as an independent before joining the newly founded GWHC alongside the Nanooks. After it dissolved, the Seawolves also played as an independent before joining the WCHA in 1994, around the same time Alaska joined the nearby CCHA. In 2020, the University of Alaska announced that UAA hockey would be cut after the 2020-21 season due to a reduction in state funding unless the program could raise 3 million dollars, and the program went on hiatus that year while its future was uncertain. Ultimately, the program was saved, and it returned to play in the 2022-23 season as an independent, following the dissolution of the men's side of its former conference, the WCHA.

The Sun Devils moved up from club hockey in the ACHA to full varsity status. Arizona State began playing a full Division I schedule in 2016–17. The Sharks launched their men's program for the 2020–21 season.

With the 2020–21 season dramatically impacted by COVID-19, both Arizona State and LIU were in scheduling alliances with Division I conferences for that season, respectively with the Big Ten Conference and Atlantic Hockey.

In 2021–22, Lindenwood fielded two separate men's club teams, each playing at a different level of the American Collegiate Hockey Association (ACHA), which governs the sport at club level. On March 23, 2022, Lindenwood announced that it would launch a Division I men's varsity program starting in the 2022–23 season, while maintaining its ACHA program. This announcement came shortly after the school announced it was starting a transition from Division II to Division I in July 2022, joining the non-hockey Ohio Valley Conference.

On April 5, 2022, Stonehill, then a member of the D-II Northeast-10 Conference (NE-10), announced it was joining the Northeast Conference (which also does not sponsor ice hockey) that July, starting its own transition to D-I. Before this announcement, Stonehill had been one of seven NE-10 members that played men's ice hockey under Division II regulations, despite the NCAA not sponsoring a championship event at that level. (All other D-II schools with varsity men's ice hockey play under D-I regulations.)

Women
No women's program has competed as an independent in the National Collegiate division of women's ice hockey, the de facto equivalent of Division I in that sport, since the 2018–19 season. The NCAA has never sponsored a Division II championship in the sport, although it does sponsor a Division III championship.

Five schools competed as independents in the 2018–19 season, all participating in the nascent New England Women's Hockey Alliance (NEWHA), which had originally been established in 2017 as a scheduling alliance among all of the then-current National Collegiate independents. The NEWHA initially included six schools, but Holy Cross left after the inaugural 2017–18 NEWHA season to join Hockey East. The NEWHA officially organized as a conference in advance of the 2018–19 season, but was not officially recognized by the NCAA as a Division I league until the 2019–20 season, by which time the newly launched LIU program had joined as the sixth member.

The newest National Collegiate hockey school is Stonehill, which started varsity play in the 2022–23 season as the newest (full) member of the NEWHA. Two other schools will add the sport in 2023–24. Assumption joined the NEWHA for administrative purposes alongside Stonehill in 2022, but will not start conference play until launching its varsity team a year later. Robert Morris, which had dropped the sport after the 2020–21 season due to COVID-19 impacts, will resume play in 2023–24, returning to its previous conference of College Hockey America.

Current programs which were at one point independent

Men

Women

Defunct teams

Men

Women

See also
 List of NCAA Division I ice hockey programs
 NCAA Division I independent schools
 NCAA Division II independent schools (ice hockey)
 NCAA Division III independent schools (ice hockey)

References

NCAA Division I Independents
Independents, ice hockey

Ice
Independent